The Carlton D. Wall House, also known as Snowflake, is a Frank Lloyd Wright designed home in Plymouth Township, Michigan. It is one of Wright's more elaborate Usonian homes. In 1941, recently married Mr. and Mrs. Carlton David Wall, who were Wright's youngest clients, approached Wright to design a house for them after Carlton Wall studied Wright's architecture in college.

Its form is a series of hexagons radiating from a central chimney or service core without any true right angles, with many different wings off it for a nursery, terrace, guest room and carport. The cypress and brick house came to be known as Snowflake because of the hexagonal patterns created by the diamond grid design. This was the first use of Wright's modular diamond structure in Michigan, a technique he used elsewhere when incorporating a house into a hillside.

A massive brick retaining wall supports a dramatic terrace. Floor to ceiling windows, doors without mullions, and corner windows are used throughout the house. This brings the "outside in", which is the case in all Wright houses. From 1943 to 1944, Milton Horn collaborated with Wright on a wood relief mural for the house. In 1947, a  bedroom wing was added to accommodate the Walls' growing family. It is located to the west of the original house.

Snowflake was purchased by Tom Monaghan, the founder of Domino's Pizza, in 1983, and it was used on a rotating basis by executives of his corporation. It was to be part of Mr. Monaghan's Frank Lloyd Wright Study Center. In the late 1980s it was sold to the current owners who use it as their personal residence.

References

 Storrer, William Allin. The Frank Lloyd Wright Companion. University Of Chicago Press, 2006,  (S.281)

External links
 Carlton D. Wall House "SnowFlake" - Frank Lloyd Wright Designed Buildings on Waymarking.com
 Not PC: Carl Wall House - Frank Lloyd Wright
 Wall House on michiganmodern.org

Houses on the National Register of Historic Places in Michigan
Frank Lloyd Wright buildings
Houses in Wayne County, Michigan
National Register of Historic Places in Wayne County, Michigan